Manuel Rosas Sánchez (29 February 1912 in Mexico City – 20 February 1989), nicknamed Chaquetas, was a Mexican footballer who participated in the 1930 FIFA World Cup. He was the first player in the history of FIFA World Cup who scored a goal from the penalty kick spot (against Argentina). With the first goal he scored during the World Cup, he became, at the time, the youngest player to have scored in the FIFA World Cup, a record later broken by Pelé, Rosas is still the second youngest player to have scored at a world cup. He was also the first Mexican player to score multiple goals in World Cup play (the first to score more than two goals was Luis Hernandez, 68 years later) and the first player to score an own goal in the history of FIFA World Cup (against Chile).

His brother, Felipe Rosas, also played in the 1930 World Cup. Both were players of Atlante F.C. during the tournament.

International goals
Mexico's goal tally first

Sources 

1912 births
1989 deaths
Mexican footballers
Mexico international footballers
Atlante F.C. footballers
1930 FIFA World Cup players
Association football defenders